A subapical consonant is a consonant made by contact with the underside of the tip of the tongue. The only common subapical articulations are in the postalveolar to palatal region, which are called "retroflex".

Most so-called retroflex consonants are more properly called apical. True subapical retroflexes are found in the Dravidian languages of Southern India.

Occasionally, the term "sublaminal" is used for "subapical", which might be better used for sounds pronounced between the underside of the tongue and the floor of the mouth, such as sucking-teeth and the slapped clicks of Sandawe.

References
 Peter Ladefoged; Ian Maddieson. The Sounds of the World's Languages. Oxford: Blackwell 1996. .
 Sanford B. Steever (ed.). The Dravidian Languages. Routledge. New edition 2006. .

Retroflex consonants